Craig Kline Dixon (March 3, 1926 – February 25, 2021) was an American athlete who competed mainly in the 110 meter hurdles. He competed for the United States in the 1948 Summer Olympics held in London, Great Britain in the 110 meter hurdles where he won the bronze medal. Dixon was born in Los Angeles, California.

References 

1926 births
2021 deaths
American male hurdlers
Olympic bronze medalists for the United States in track and field
Athletes (track and field) at the 1948 Summer Olympics
Track and field athletes from California
Medalists at the 1948 Summer Olympics
Track and field athletes from Los Angeles
20th-century American people